Bubák is a surname. Notable people with the surname include:

Alois Bubák (1824–1870), Czech illustrator and landscape painter
František Bubák (1866–1925), Czech mycologist and phytopathologist

See also
Sangi Dari Bubak, Iranian village